Digestive may refer to:

Biology
Digestion, biological process of metabolism

Food and drink
Digestif, small beverage at the end of a meal
Digestive biscuit, a British semi-sweet biscuit